Bill Coleman is an American businessman, radio broadcaster, and politician serving as a member of the Oklahoma Senate from the 10th district. Elected in November 2018, he assumed office on November 14, 2018.

Early life and education 
Coleman was born in Durant, Oklahoma and graduated from Pawhuska High School.

Career 
Outside of politics, Coleman has worked as a radio broadcaster. He was also a member of the board of the National Association of Broadcasters. Coleman is the owner of Team Radio Marketing Group, a holding company that operates KLOR-FM, KPNC, and KOSB. Coleman was elected to the Oklahoma Senate by defeating Amber Roberts in a Republican Party primary runoff election. He was sworn into office on November 14, 2018. Within the state senate, Coleman serves as vice chair of the Senate Business, Commerce, and Tourism Committee.

References 

Living people
People from Durant, Oklahoma
People from Ponca City, Oklahoma
Republican Party Oklahoma state senators
American radio executives
21st-century American politicians
Year of birth missing (living people)